New York's 133rd State Assembly district is one of the 150 districts in the New York State Assembly. It has been represented by Marjorie Byrnes since 2019, defeating Joseph Errigo in the 2018 Republican primary.

Geography
District 133 contains portions of Monroe and Steuben counties and all of Livingston County.

Recent election results

2022

2020

2018

2016
Then-incumbent Bill Nojay died one week before the Republican primary, which he posthumously won. The Republican chairmen for the district's overlying counties selected Joseph Errigo to replace him on the general election ballot.

2014

2012

References

133
Steuben County, New York
Livingston County, New York
Monroe County, New York